Ahrida (Ohrid) Synagogue is one of the oldest synagogues in Istanbul, Turkey. It is located in Balat, once a thriving Jewish quarter in the city.

History
It was built by Romaniotes (Macedonian Jews), dating back to the 1430s, from the city of Ohrid (called 'Ahrid' in Greek) in what was then the Ottoman Empire and is now North Macedonia.  Neve Shalom is said to have moved to Constantinople more than 550 years ago. Sephardi Jews arrived in the Ottoman Empire from the Iberian peninsula beginning in 1492, and soon were a larger group of Jews in population than the Romaniotes. The Romaniotes of Istanbul, as in many communities, including Thessaloniki became assimilated into the Sephardic culture and adopted the Sephardic liturgy as well as the language of the Sefardim, Judezmo. 
The synagogue building, one of the two ancient synagogues in Istanbul's Golden Horn, was renovated in 1992 by the Quincentennial Foundation, in celebration of the 500th anniversary of Sephardic Jews' arrival in the Ottoman Empire. Ahrida Synagogue is known for its boat-shaped tevah (the reading platform, known in Ashkenazi communities as a bimah). Ahrida Synagogue is also the only synagogue in Istanbul at which Sabbatai Zevi, founder of the Jewish Sabbatean movement, prayed.

See also
 History of the Jews in Turkey
 List of synagogues in Turkey
 Romaniotes
 History of the Jews in Greece
 Sephardi Jews
 Jewish ethnic divisions#Geographic distribution

References and notes

External links
 Chief Rabbinate of Turkey
 Shalom Newspaper - The main Jewish newspaper in Turkey
 Ahrida Synagogue of Istanbul
https://synagogues-360.anumuseum.org.il/gallery/ahrida-synagogue/

Sephardi Jewish culture in Turkey
Sephardi synagogues
Synagogues in Istanbul
Synagogues in the Ottoman Empire